The grey wall sponge (Stelletta agulhana) is a species of sea sponge belonging to the family Ancorinidae. It is found around the coast of Southern Africa from the Northern Cape to KwaZulu-Natal. It is an endemic species.

Description 
The grey wall sponge may grow to 10 cm thick and 40–50 cm in length. It is a massive grey sponge with fine spicules protruding from its surface. It has a stony texture, with small oscula visible on the upper surface.

Habitat 
This sponge lives on rocky reefs in 2-90m of water.

References 

Tetractinellida
Animals described in 1907